Novitec, located in Stetten, Bavaria, Germany, is a tuner that specializes in modifications for Italian marques such as Ferrari, Fiat , Alfa Romeo and Lamborghini In 2007 Novitec also spawned Novitec Tridente, an arm of the business dedicated to Maserati tuning. Another division of the company, Spofec, focuses on tuning Rolls-Royce vehicles.

Novitec modifications are generally focused on performance oriented parts that improve the way Ferraris brake, handle and accelerate.

The second Novitec Rosso project was to twin-supercharge the Ferrari F430. Novitec has released several versions of the car with an original  model and later with an upgraded  model. In an article in the Nov/Dec issue of Modified Luxury & Exotics magazine the author said after driving the car that, "It's a humbling experience to drive a car that can outperform your own desires, but it's not without its rewards."

References

External links

Novitec Rosso F430 test drive
Novitec Rosso for the Ferrari 599 GTB

Auto parts suppliers of Germany
Automotive motorsports and performance companies
Ferrari